This is a comprehensive listing of the bird species recorded in Kenai Fjords National Park, which is in the U.S. state of Alaska. Unless otherwise noted, this list is based on one published by the National Park Service (NPS). Most of the waters adjacent to the Park are not actually part of it even when (as in the fjords), the water is almost entirely surrounded by Park land. Species recorded in waters near the park are also included here.

This list is presented in the taxonomic sequence of the Check-list of North and Middle American Birds, 7th edition through the 63rd Supplement, published by the American Ornithological Society (AOS). Common and scientific names are also those of the Check-list, except that the common names of families are from the Clements taxonomy because the AOS list does not include them.

This list contains 227 species when taxonomic changes have been made. The following codes and definitions are used by the NPS to annotate some of them. The others are residents and regular migrants which a visitor can expect to see at least monthly in the proper season and habitat.

(PP) = Probably present - "High confidence species occurs in park but current, verified evidence needed" (17 species)
(Unc) = Unconfirmed - "Species is attributed to park but evidence is weak or absent" (37 species)
(Adj) = Adjacent - "Species is known to occur in areas near to or contiguous with park boundaries" (31 species)
(R) = Rare - "Present, but usually seen only a few times each year" (27 species)
(O) = Occasional - "Occurs in the park at least once every few years, varying in numbers, but not necessarily every year" (13 species)

Ducks, geese, and waterfowl

Order: AnseriformesFamily: Anatidae

The family Anatidae includes the ducks and most duck-like waterfowl, such as geese and swans. These birds are adapted to an aquatic existence with webbed feet, bills which are flattened to a greater or lesser extent, and feathers that are excellent at shedding water due to special oils.

Emperor goose, Anser canagica (PP)
Snow goose, Anser caerulescens (Unc)
Greater white-fronted goose, Anser albifrons (O)
Brant, Branta bernicla
Canada goose, Branta canadensis
Trumpeter swan, Cygnus buccinator (R)
Tundra swan, Cygnus columbianus (O)
Blue-winged teal, Spatula discors (PP)
Cinnamon teal, Spatula cyanoptera (Unc)
Northern shoveler, Spatula clypeata (R)
Gadwall, Mareca strepera
Eurasian wigeon, Mareca penelope (O)
American wigeon, Mareca americana
Mallard, Anas platyrhynchos
Northern pintail, Anas acuta
Green-winged teal, Anas crecca
Canvasback, Aythya valisineria (O)
Redhead, Aythya americana (Unc)
Ring-necked duck, Aythya collaris (O)
Greater scaup, Aythya marila
Lesser scaup, Aythya affinis (PP)
Steller's eider, Polysticta stelleri (Adj)
King eider, Somateria spectabilis (Adj)
Common eider, Somateria mollissima (Adj)
Harlequin duck, Histrionicus histrionicus
Surf scoter, Melanitta perspicillata (Adj)
White-winged scoter, Melanitta deglandi (Adj)
Black scoter, Melanitta americana (Adj)
Long-tailed duck, Clangula hyemalis
Bufflehead, Bucephala albeola
Common goldeneye, Bucephala clangula
Barrow's goldeneye, Bucephala islandica
Hooded merganser, Lophodytes cucullatus (PP)
Common merganser, Mergus merganser
Red-breasted merganser, Mergus serrator

Pheasants, grouse, and allies
Order: GalliformesFamily: Phasianidae

Phasianidae consists of the pheasants and their allies. These are terrestrial species, variable in size but generally plump with broad relatively short wings. Many species are gamebirds or have been domesticated as a food source for humans.

Spruce grouse, Canachites canadensis
Willow ptarmigan, Lagopus lagopus
Rock ptarmigan, Lagopus muta
White-tailed ptarmigan, Lagopus leucurus (R)

Grebes
Order: PodicipediformesFamily: Podicipedidae

Grebes are small to medium-large freshwater diving birds. They have lobed toes and are excellent swimmers and divers. However, they have their feet placed far back on the body, making them quite ungainly on land.

Horned grebe, Podiceps auritus (Adj)
Red-necked grebe, Podiceps grisegena (Adj)

Pigeons and doves
Order: ColumbiformesFamily: Columbidae

Pigeons and doves are stout-bodied birds with short necks and short slender bills with a fleshy cere.

Rock pigeon, Columba livia (Unc) (Not on the official Alaska checklist)
Mourning dove, Zenaida macroura (Unc)

Hummingbirds
Order: ApodiformesFamily: Trochilidae

Hummingbirds are small birds capable of hovering in mid-air due to the rapid flapping of their wings. They are the only birds that can fly backwards.

Rufous hummingbird, Selasphorus rufus

Cranes
Order: GruiformesFamily: Gruidae

Cranes are large, long-legged, and long-necked birds. Unlike the similar-looking but unrelated herons, cranes fly with necks outstretched, not pulled back. Most have elaborate and noisy courting displays or "dances".

Sandhill crane, Antigone canadensis

Oystercatchers
Order: CharadriiformesFamily: Haematopodidae

The oystercatchers are large, obvious, and noisy plover-like birds, with strong bills used for smashing or prising open molluscs.

Black oystercatcher, Haematopus bachmani

Plovers and lapwings
Order: CharadriiformesFamily: Charadriidae

The family Charadriidae includes the plovers, dotterels, and lapwings. They are small to medium-sized birds with compact bodies, short thick necks, and long, usually pointed, wings. They are found in open country worldwide, mostly in habitats near water.

Black-bellied plover, Pluvialis squatarola
American golden-plover, Pluvialis dominica (R)
Pacific golden-plover, Pluvialis fulva (Unc)
Killdeer, Charadrius vociferus (Unc)
Semipalmated plover, Charadrius semipalmatus

Sandpipers and allies
Order: CharadriiformesFamily: Scolopacidae

Scolopacidae is a large diverse family of small to medium-sized shorebirds including the sandpipers, curlews, godwits, shanks, tattlers, woodcocks, snipes, dowitchers, and phalaropes. The majority of these species eat small invertebrates picked out of the mud or soil. Different lengths of legs and bills enable multiple species to feed in the same habitat, particularly on the coast, without direct competition for food.

Whimbrel, Numenius phaeopus
Far Eastern curlew, Numenius madagascariensis (Unc)
Eurasian curlew, Numenius arquata (Unc) (Not on the official Alaska checklist)
Bar-tailed godwit, Limosa lapponica (Unc)
Hudsonian godwit, Limosa haemastica (PP)
Marbled godwit, Limosa fedoa (R)
Ruddy turnstone, Arenaria interpres (R)
Black turnstone, Arenaria melanocephala
Surfbird, Calidris virgata (R)
Sharp-tailed sandpiper, Calidris acuminata (PP)
Sanderling, Calidris alba (PP)
Dunlin, Calidris alpina
Rock sandpiper, Calidris ptilocnemis (R)
Baird's sandpiper, Calidris bairdii (Unc)
Least sandpiper, Calidris minutilla
Pectoral sandpiper, Calidris melanotos
Semipalmated sandpiper, Calidris pusilla (R)
Western sandpiper, Calidris mauri
Short-billed dowitcher, Limnodromus griseus
Long-billed dowitcher, Limnodromus scolopaceus (PP)
Wilson's snipe, Gallinago delicata
Spotted sandpiper, Actitis macularia
Solitary sandpiper, Tringa solitaria (O)
Gray-tailed tattler, Tringa brevipes (Unc)
Wandering tattler, Tringa incana
Lesser yellowlegs, Tringa flavipes
Greater yellowlegs, Tringa melanoleuca
Red-necked phalarope, Phalaropus lobatus
Red phalarope, Phalaropus fulicarius (R)

Skuas and jaegers
Order: CharadriiformesFamily: Stercorariidae

Jaegers and skuas are in general medium to large birds, typically with gray or brown plumage, often with white markings on the wings. They have longish bills with hooked tips and webbed feet with sharp claws. They look like large dark gulls, but have a fleshy cere above the upper mandible. They are strong, acrobatic fliers.

Pomarine jaeger, Stercorarius pomarinus (Adj)
Parasitic jaeger, Stercorarius parasiticus (R)
Long-tailed jaeger, Stercorarius longicaudus (Adj)

Auks, murres, and puffins
Order: CharadriiformesFamily: Alcidae

The family Alcidae includes auks, murres, and puffins. These are short-winged birds that live on the open sea and normally only come ashore for breeding.

Common murre, Uria aalge
Thick-billed murre, Uria lomvia (R)
Pigeon guillemot, Cepphus columba
Marbled murrelet, Brachyramphus marmoratus
Kittlitz's murrelet, Brachyramphus brevirostris
Ancient murrelet, Synthliboarmphus antiquus (Adj)
Cassin's auklet, Ptychoramphus aleuticus (Adj)
Parakeet auklet, Aethia psittacula (Adj)
Least auklet, Aethia pusilla (Unc)
Crested auklet, Aethia cristatella (PP)
Rhinoceros auklet, Cerorhinca monocerata (Adj)
Horned puffin, Fratercula corniculata
Tufted puffin, Fratercula cirrhata

Gulls, terns, and skimmers

Order: CharadriiformesFamily: Laridae

Laridae is a family of medium to large seabirds and includes gulls, terns, kittiwakes, and skimmers. They are typically gray or white, often with black markings on the head or wings. They have stout, longish bills and webbed feet.

Black-legged kittiwake, Rissa tridactyla
Red-legged kittiwake, Rissa brevirostris (Unc)
Ivory gull, Pagophila eburnea (Unc)
Sabine's gull, Xema sabini (Adj)
Bonaparte's gull, Chroicocephalus philadelphia
Black-headed gull, Chroicocephalus ridibundus (O)
Short-billed gull, Larus brachyrhynchus
Ring-billed gull, Larus delawarensis (Unc)
Herring gull, Larus argentatus
Iceland gull, Larus glaucoides (Adj)
Glaucous-winged gull, Larus glaucescens
Glaucous gull, Larus hyperboreus
Aleutian tern, Onychoprion aleuticus (O)
Caspian tern, Hydroprogne caspia (PP)
Arctic tern, Sterna paradisaea

Loons
Order: GaviiformesFamily: Gaviidae

Loons are aquatic birds the size of a large duck, to which they are unrelated. Their plumage is largely gray or black, and they have spear-shaped bills. Loons swim well and fly adequately, but are almost hopeless on land, because their legs are placed towards the rear of the body.

Red-throated loon, Gavia stellata (Adj)
Pacific loon, Gavia pacifica (Adj)
Common loon, Gavia immer (Adj)
Yellow-billed loon, Gavia adamsii (Adj)

Albatrosses
Order: ProcellariiformesFamily: Diomedeidae

The albatrosses are amongst the largest of flying birds, and the great albatrosses from the genus Diomedea have the largest wingspans of any extant birds.

Laysan albatross, Phoebastria immutabilis (Adj)
Black-footed albatross, Phoebastria nigripes (Adj)
Short-tailed albatross, Phoebastria albatrus (Adj)

Northern storm-petrels
Order: ProcellariiformesFamily: Hydrobatidae

The storm-petrels are the smallest seabirds, relatives of the petrels, feeding on planktonic crustaceans and small fish picked from the surface, typically while hovering. The flight is fluttering and sometimes bat-like.

Fork-tailed storm-petrel, Hydrobates furcatus (Adj)
Leach's storm-petrel, Hydrobates leucorhous (Adj)

Shearwaters and petrels

Order: ProcellariiformesFamily: Procellariidae

The procellariids are the main group of medium-sized "true petrels", characterized by united nostrils with medium septum and a long outer functional primary.

Northern fulmar, Fulmarus glacialis (Adj)
Mottled petrel, Pterodroma inexpectata (Adj)
Buller's shearwater, Ardenna bulleri (Adj)
Short-tailed shearwater, Ardenna tenuirostris (Adj)
Sooty shearwater, Ardenna griseus (Adj)
Pink-footed shearwater, Ardenna creatopus (Adj)
Flesh-footed shearwater, Ardenna carneipes (Unc)
Manx shearwater, Puffinus puffinus (Unc)

Cormorants and shags
Order: SuliformesFamily: Phalacrocoracidae

Cormorants are medium-to-large aquatic birds, usually with mainly dark plumage and areas of colored skin on the face. The bill is long, thin, and sharply hooked. Their feet are four-toed and webbed.

Brandt's cormorant, Urile penicillatus (Unc)
Red-faced cormorant, Urile urile
Pelagic cormorant, Urile pelagicus
Double-crested cormorant, Nannopterum auritum

Herons, egrets, and bitterns
Order: PelecaniformesFamily: Ardeidae

The family Ardeidae contains the herons, egrets, and bitterns. Herons and egrets are medium to large wading birds with long necks and legs. Bitterns tend to be shorter necked and more secretive. Members of Ardeidae fly with their necks retracted, unlike other long-necked birds such as storks, ibises, and spoonbills.

Great blue heron, Ardea herodias (R)

Osprey
Order: AccipitriformesFamily: Pandionidae

Pandionidae is a monotypic family of fish-eating birds of prey.  Its single species possesses a very large and powerful hooked beak, strong legs, strong talons, and keen eyesight.

Osprey, Pandion haliaetus (PP)

Hawks, eagles, and kites
Order: AccipitriformesFamily: Accipitridae

Accipitridae is a family of birds of prey which includes hawks, eagles, kites, harriers, and Old World vultures. These birds have very large powerful hooked beaks for tearing flesh from their prey, strong legs, powerful talons, and keen eyesight.

Golden eagle, Aquila chrysaetos (R)
Northern harrier, Circus hudsonius
Sharp-shinned hawk, Accipiter striatus
Northern goshawk, Accipiter gentilis
Bald eagle, Haliaeetus leucocephalus
Swainson's hawk, Buteo swainsoni (Unc)
Red-tailed hawk, Buteo jamaicensis (Unc)
Rough-legged hawk, Buteo lagopus (R)

Owls
Order: StrigiformesFamily: Strigidae

Typical owls are small to large solitary nocturnal birds of prey. They have large forward-facing eyes and ears, a hawk-like beak, and a conspicuous circle of feathers around each eye called a facial disk.

Western screech-owl, Megascops kennicottii (PP)
Great horned owl, Bubo virginianus
Snowy owl, Bubo scandiacus (Unc)
Northern hawk owl, Surnia ulula (PP)
Great gray owl, Strix nebulosa (PP)
Short-eared owl, Asio flammeus (PP)
Boreal owl, Aegolius funereus (PP)
Northern saw-whet owl, Aegolius acadicus (PP)

Kingfishers
Order: CoraciiformesFamily: Alcedinidae

Kingfishers are medium-sized birds with large heads, long, pointed bills, short legs, and stubby tails.

Belted kingfisher, Megaceryle alcyon

Woodpeckers
Order: PiciformesFamily: Picidae

Woodpeckers are small to medium-sized birds with chisel-like beaks, short legs, stiff tails, and long tongues used for capturing insects. Some species have feet with two toes pointing forward and two backward, while several species have only three toes. Many woodpeckers have the habit of tapping noisily on tree trunks with their beaks.

American three-toed woodpecker, Picoides dorsalis (Unc)
Black-backed woodpecker, Picoides arcticus (O)
Downy woodpecker, Dryobates pubescens
Hairy woodpecker, Dryobates villosus
Northern flicker, Colaptes auratus (R)

Falcons and caracaras
Order: FalconiformesFamily: Falconidae

Falconidae is a family of diurnal birds of prey, notably the falcons and caracaras. They differ from hawks, eagles, and kites in that they kill with their beaks instead of their talons.

Merlin, Falco columbarius (R)
Gyrfalcon, Falco rusticolus (O)
Peregrine falcon, Falco peregrinus (R)

Tyrant flycatchers
Order: PasseriformesFamily: Tyrannidae

Tyrant flycatchers are Passerine birds which occur throughout North and South America. They superficially resemble the Old World flycatchers, but are more robust and have stronger bills. They do not have the sophisticated vocal capabilities of the songbirds. Most, but not all, are rather plain. As the name implies, most are insectivorous.

Western kingbird, Tyrannus verticalis (Unc)
Olive-sided flycatcher, Contopus cooperi (R)
Western wood-pewee, Contopus sordidulus (R)
Alder flycatcher, Empidonax alnorum
Say's phoebe, Sayornis saya (Unc)

Vireos, shrike-babblers, and erpornis
Order: PasseriformesFamily: Vireonidae

The vireos are a group of small to medium-sized passerine birds restricted to the New World. They are typically greenish in color and resemble wood warblers apart from their heavier bills.

Warbling vireo, Vireo gilvus (Unc)

Shrikes
Order: PasseriformesFamily: Laniidae

Shrikes are passerine birds known for their habit of catching other birds and small animals and impaling the uneaten portions of their bodies on thorns. A shrike's beak is hooked, like that of a typical bird of prey.

Northern shrike, Lanius borealis (R)

Crows, jays, and magpies
Order: PasseriformesFamily: Corvidae

The family Corvidae includes crows, ravens, jays, choughs, magpies, treepies, nutcrackers, and ground jays. Corvids are above average in size among the Passeriformes, and some of the larger species show high levels of intelligence.

Canada jay, Perisoreus canadensis
Steller's jay, Cyanocitta stelleri
Black-billed magpie, Pica hudsonia
American crow, Corvus brachyrhynchos
Common raven, Corvus corax

Tits, chickadees, and titmice
Order: PasseriformesFamily: Paridae

The Paridae are mainly small stocky woodland species with short stout bills. Some have crests. They are adaptable birds, with a mixed diet including seeds and insects.

Black-capped chickadee, Poecile atricapilla
Chestnut-backed chickadee, Poecile rufescens
Boreal chickadee, Poecile hudsonica

Larks
Order: PasseriformesFamily: Alaudidae

Larks are small terrestrial birds with often extravagant songs and display flights. Most larks are fairly dull in appearance. Their food is insects and seeds.

Horned lark, Eremophila alpestris (Unc)

Swallows
Order: PasseriformesFamily: Hirundinidae

The family Hirundinidae is a group of passerines characterized by their adaptation to aerial feeding. These adaptations include a slender streamlined body, long pointed wings, and short bills with a wide gape. The feet are adapted to perching rather than walking, and the front toes are partially joined at the base.

Bank swallow, Riparia riparia
Tree swallow, Tachycineta bicolor
Violet-green swallow, Tachycineta thalassina
Purple martin, Progne subis (Unc)
Barn swallow, Hirundo rustica (Unc)
Cliff swallow, Petrochelidon pyrrhonota (Unc)

Kinglets
Order: PasseriformesFamily: Regulidae

The kinglets are a small family of birds which resemble the titmice. They are very small insectivorous birds, mostly in the genus Regulus. The adults have colored crowns, giving rise to their names.

Ruby-crowned kinglet, Corthylio calendula
Golden-crowned kinglet, Regulus satrapa

Waxwings
Order: PasseriformesFamily: Bombycillidae

The waxwings are a group of birds with soft silky plumage and unique red tips to some of the wing feathers. In the Bohemian and cedar waxwings, these tips look like sealing wax and give the group its name. These are arboreal birds of northern forests. They live on insects in summer and berries in winter.

Bohemian waxwing, Bombycilla garrulus (R)
Cedar waxwing, Bombycilla cedrorum (Unc)

Nuthatches
Order: PasseriformesFamily: Sittidae

Nuthatches are small woodland birds. They have the unusual ability to climb down trees head first, unlike other birds which can only go upwards. Nuthatches have big heads, short tails, and powerful bills and feet.

Red-breasted nuthatch, Sitta canadensis

Treecreepers
Order: PasseriformesFamily: Certhiidae

Treecreepers are small woodland birds, brown above and white below. They have thin pointed down-curved bills, which they use to extricate insects from bark. They have stiff tail feathers, like woodpeckers, which they use to support themselves on vertical trees.

Brown creeper, Certhia americana (R)

Wrens
Order: PasseriformesFamily: Troglodytidae

Wrens are small and inconspicuous birds, except for their loud songs. They have short wings and thin down-turned bills. Several species often hold their tails upright.

Pacific wren, Troglodytes pacificus

Starlings
Order: PasseriformesFamily: Sturnidae

Starlings are small to medium-sized passerine birds. They are medium-sized passerines with strong feet. Their flight is strong and direct and they are very gregarious. Their preferred habitat is fairly open country, and they eat insects and fruit. Plumage is typically dark with a metallic sheen.

European starling, Sturnus vulgaris (R) (Introduced to North America)

Dippers
Order: PasseriformesFamily: Cinclidae

Dippers are small, stout, birds that feed in cold, fast moving streams.

American dipper, Cinclus mexicanus

Thrushes and allies
Order: PasseriformesFamily: Turdidae

The thrushes are a group of passerine birds that occur mainly but not exclusively in the Old World. They are plump, soft plumaged, small to medium-sized insectivores or sometimes omnivores, often feeding on the ground. Many have attractive songs.

Townsend's solitaire, Myadestes townsendi (O)
Gray-cheeked thrush, Catharus minimus
Swainson's thrush, Catharus ustulatus
Hermit thrush, Catharus guttatus
American robin, Turdus migratorius
Varied thrush, Ixoreus naevius

Old World flycatchers
Order: PasseriformesFamily: Muscicapidae

This a large family of small passerine birds restricted to the Old World. Most of the species below only occur in North America as vagrants. The appearance of these birds is highly varied, but they mostly have weak songs and harsh calls.

Northern wheatear, Oenanthe oenanthe (Unc)

Wagtails and pipits
Order: PasseriformesFamily: Motacillidae

Motacillidae is a family of small passerine birds with medium to long tails. They include the wagtails, longclaws, and pipits. They are slender ground-feeding insectivores of open country.

American pipit, Anthus rubescens

Finches, euphonias, and allies
Order: PasseriformesFamily: Fringillidae

Finches are seed-eating passerine birds, that are small to moderately large and have a strong beak, usually conical and in some species very large. All have twelve tail feathers and nine primaries. These birds have a bouncing flight with alternating bouts of flapping and gliding on closed wings, and most sing well.

Brambling, Fringilla montifringilla (O)
Pine grosbeak, Pinicola enucleator
Gray-crowned rosy-finch, Leucosticte tephrocotis
Common redpoll, Acanthis flammea
Hoary redpoll, Acanthis hornemanni (Unc)
Red crossbill, Loxia curvirostra
White-winged crossbill, Loxia leucoptera
Pine siskin, Spinus pinus

Longspurs and snow buntings
Order: PasseriformesFamily: Calcariidae

The Calcariidae are a group of passerine birds that had been traditionally grouped with the New World sparrows, but differ in a number of respects and are usually found in open grassy areas.

Lapland longspur, Calcarius lapponicus (Unc)
Snow bunting, Plectrophenax nivalis
McKay's bunting, Plectrophenax hyperboreus (Unc)

New World sparrows
Order: PasseriformesFamily: Passerellidae

Until 2017, these species were considered part of the family Emberizidae. Most of the species are known as sparrows, but these birds are not closely related to the Old World sparrows which are in the family Passeridae. Many of these have distinctive head patterns.

Fox sparrow, Passerella iliaca
American tree sparrow, Spizelloides arborea (O)
Dark-eyed junco, Junco hyemalis
White-crowned sparrow, Zonotrichia leucophrys
Golden-crowned sparrow, Zonotrichia atricapilla
White-throated sparrow, Zonotrichia albicollis  (Unc)
Savannah sparrow, Passerculus sandwichensis
Song sparrow, Melospiza melodia
Lincoln's sparrow, Melospiza lincolnii

Troupials and allies
Order: PasseriformesFamily: Icteridae

The icterids are a group of small to medium-sized, often colorful passerine birds restricted to the New World and include the grackles, New World blackbirds, and New World orioles. Most species have black as a predominant plumage color, often enlivened by yellow, orange, or red.

Red-winged blackbird, Agelaius phoeniceus (Unc)
Rusty blackbird, Euphagus carolinus (R)

New World warblers
Order: PasseriformesFamily: Parulidae

The wood-warblers are a group of small often colorful passerine birds restricted to the New World. Most are arboreal, but some like the ovenbird and the two waterthrushes are more terrestrial. Most members of this family are insectivores.

Northern waterthrush, Parkesia noveboracensis (R)
Orange-crowned warbler, Leiothlypis celata
Yellow warbler, Setophaga petechia
Blackpoll warbler, Setophaga striata (R)
Yellow-rumped warbler, Setophaga coronata
Townsend's warbler, Setophaga townsendi
Wilson's warbler, Cardellina pusilla

References

See also
List of birds of Alaska
List of birds of Denali National Park and Preserve
List of birds
Lists of birds by region
List of North American birds

birds
Alaska, Kenai Fjords
Birds